Lamma Winds is a wind farm, more accurately a lone wind turbine, in Tai Ling, Lamma Island, Hong Kong where the average wind velocity is 5.5 m/s.

Built near the Lamma Power Station and owned by Hongkong Electric, on average it provides slightly over 100 kW of power to Hong Kong Island and Lamma Island.

Technical details

Lamma Winds began operating on 23 February 2006, and was the first commercial-scale wind turbine in Hong Kong.
It can generate enough power for approximately 250 households in ideal conditions, though considerably fewer in typical conditions.
Before the construction of the wind turbine, Environmental Resources Management of Hong Kong (ERMHK) analyzed its environmental impacts, and predicted no significant adverse effects.

Exhibition centre

Lamma Winds is one of the relatively few commercial-scale wind turbines in the world that is open to the public. An exhibition centre surrounds the base of the wind turbine, and is open daily from 7 AM to 6 PM, including weekends and holidays. Access to the exhibition center is on foot; the walk from Yung Shue Wan Ferry Pier takes about 40 minutes.

See also

 Electricity sector in Hong Kong
 List of power stations in Hong Kong

References

External links

Lamma Winds

Lamma Island
Wind farms in Hong Kong
Wind turbines
2006 establishments in Hong Kong